The Marion micropolitan area may refer to:

The Marion, Indiana micropolitan area, United States
The Marion, North Carolina micropolitan area, United States
The Marion, Ohio micropolitan area, United States

See also
Marion (disambiguation)